Ravindra Singh is an Indian film director and producer. His work as a producer includes Nakshatra (2010), Pappu Can't Dance Saala (2011), I Am 24 (2012), In Rahon Se (2016) and Udanchhoo (2018). His upcoming film is Rum Pum Posshh.

References

External links 
 
 

Living people
Film directors from Delhi
Film producers from Delhi
Year of birth missing (living people)